McSwain is an unincorporated community and census-designated place (CDP) in Merced County, California, United States. As of the 2020 census, the population was 4,480, up from 4,171 in 2010.

Geography
McSwain is in central Merced County and is bordered to the north by the city of Atwater. California State Route 99 forms the northern boundary of the community.

Demographics
At the 2010 census McSwain had a population of 4,171. The racial makeup of McSwain was 3,196 (76.6%) White, 56 (1.3%) African American, 34 (0.8%) Native American, 282 (6.8%) Asian, 9 (0.2%) Pacific Islander, 422 (10.1%) from other races, and 172 (4.1%) from two or more races. Hispanic or Latino of any race were 1,081 persons (25.9%).

The census reported that 4,165 people (99.9% of the population) lived in households, 6 (0.1%) lived in non-institutionalized group quarters, and no one was institutionalized.

There were 1,334 households, 557 (41.8%) had children under the age of 18 living in them, 1,032 (77.4%) were opposite-sex married couples living together, 76 (5.7%) had a female householder with no husband present, 60 (4.5%) had a male householder with no wife present.  There were 41 (3.1%) unmarried opposite-sex partnerships, and 5 (0.4%) same-sex married couples or partnerships. 127 households (9.5%) were one person and 62 (4.6%) had someone living alone who was 65 or older. The average household size was 3.12.  There were 1,168 families (87.6% of households); the average family size was 3.31.

The age distribution was 1,147 people (27.5%) under the age of 18, 327 people (7.8%) aged 18 to 24, 898 people (21.5%) aged 25 to 44, 1,259 people (30.2%) aged 45 to 64, and 540 people (12.9%) who were 65 or older.  The median age was 40.5 years. For every 100 females, there were 105.6 males.  For every 100 females age 18 and over, there were 100.7 males.

There were 1,409 housing units at an average density of 233.4 per square mile, of the occupied units 1,196 (89.7%) were owner-occupied and 138 (10.3%) were rented. The homeowner vacancy rate was 2.0%; the rental vacancy rate was 7.2%.  3,675 people (88.1% of the population) lived in owner-occupied housing units and 490 people (11.7%) lived in rental housing units.

References

Census-designated places in Merced County, California
Census-designated places in California